The 2009–10 Wichita Thunder season was the 18th season of the CHL franchise in Wichita, Kansas.

Regular season
The Thunder relieved coach Brent Bilodeau of his duties on November 12, 2009 after a 2-7-0 start. Bilodeau was replaced by longtime Thunder veteran Jason Duda as interim head coach.

The Wichita Thunder had their very last game at their longtime home The Britt Brown Arena on January 9, 2010 where they lost to the Odessa Jackalopes 1-3.

On January 23, 2010, the Thunder lost 2-1 to the Tulsa Oilers in their inaugural game at the Intrust Bank Arena. The arena hosted a Thunder-record 13,412 fans in the team's first sellout at their new home.

Conference standings

Note: GP = Games played; W = Wins; L = Losses; OTL = Overtime loss; GF = Goals for; GA = Goals against; Pts = Points;

x - clinched playoff spot; y - clinched conference title;  e - eliminated from playoff contention

Awards

Transactions
The Thunder were involved in the following transactions during the 2009–10 season.

Trades

See also
2009–10 CHL season

External links
 2009–10 Wichita Thunder season at Pointstreak

Wichita Thunder seasons
Wich
Wich